Chorak may refer to:
Jason Chorak (b. 1974), American football player
Chorak, Hormozgan, a village in Hormozgan Province, Iran
Chorak, Zanjan, a village in Zanjan Province, Iran